Loving Rona, is a 2021 Nigerian romantic drama film directed by Luke Aire Oyovbaire and co-produced by Alex Odinigwe and Chidi Umeoji. The film stars Meg Otanwa and Gideon Okeke in the lead roles whereas Fiona Garba, Jeff (Bankz) Nweke and Erica Bale Opia made supportive roles. The film deals with a love affair between a young wealthy businesswoman Rona and her Garden boy Benny after they planned to stop the romance between Alex, Rona's ex fiancée and Jackie, his supposed masseur.

The film made its premier on 20 August 2021. The film received mixed reviews from critics.

Cast
 Meg Otanwa as Rona Adams
 Gideon Okeke as Benny Ramsey
 Fiona Garba as Jackie 
 Jeff Bankz Nweke as Alex 
 Erica Bale Opia as Emma 
 Ummi Baba Ahmed as Judith 
 Jide Bolarinwa
 Patricia Egbon

Awards and nominations

References 

English-language Nigerian films
2021 films
2021 drama films
2020s English-language films
Nigerian drama films
Nigerian romantic drama films